Serhiy Turyanskyi (born 25 May 1962 in Kolomyia Raion, Ivano-Frankivsk Oblast) is the Soviet and Ukrainian professional footballer, later the Ukrainian coach. He also played in the neighboring countries of Poland and Hungary.

Playing career
His primary football development obtained in the Kolomyia sport school. He made his professional debut in the Soviet Second League B in the beginning of the 1980s for couple of Moldavian clubs. Around mid-80s he played for the Lviv army-men, subsequently transferring to the fourth-runner of the Ivano-Frankivsk football, Prykarpattia. In 1988 Turyanskyi managed to play for Tavria as well as the amateur club from Nadvirna (Ivano-Frankivsk Oblast), eventually ending up back at Prykarpattia. Before playing abroad he also played in Vinnytsia. In 1993 Turyanskyi returned to native Prykarpattia for which played 70+ games and earning the honors of the Ukrainian First League. For short time he played in Tysmenytsia, a city next to Ivano-Frankivsk and later for Nyva Ternopil where he finished his career.

Honours
 Ukrainian First League champion.

National team
Turyanskyi played only a single game for the national team on 15 March 1994. In the game against Israel he substituted Serhiy Konovalov on the 68th minute and later received a yellow card. Ukraine has lost the game at home 0:1.

References

External links
 List of the official matches at FFU website 
 Statistics of the player at KLISF 
 National team participation 
 

1962 births
Living people
Soviet footballers
Ukrainian footballers
Ukraine international footballers
Ukrainian expatriate footballers
Ukrainian Premier League players
FC Spartak Ivano-Frankivsk players
SC Tavriya Simferopol players
FC Nyva Ternopil players
FC Zimbru Chișinău players
Nyíregyháza Spartacus FC players
Expatriate footballers in Hungary
Ukrainian football managers
FC Nyva Vinnytsia players
FC SKA-Karpaty Lviv players
FC Beskyd Nadvirna players
FC Khutrovyk Tysmenytsia players
Association football forwards
FC Spartak Ivano-Frankivsk managers
FC Prykarpattia Ivano-Frankivsk (1998) managers
FC Karpaty Yaremche managers
Sportspeople from Ivano-Frankivsk Oblast